Kovačica is a town and municipality located in the South Banat District of the autonomous province of Vojvodina, Serbia.  According to the 2011 census, the town has a population of 6,259, while Kovačica municipality has 25,274 inhabitants. It is widely known for its naïve art that the local residents make without any form of art school.

Geography
The town of Kovačica is located 27 km from Pančevo and 43 km from Belgrade.

History
The town was founded in the 18th century, but there are records of small settlements dating from 1458. In the middle of the 18th century, this area was recorded as wasteland. Settlement was founded in 1750 and was settled (in 1751–1752) by Serb soldiers from Potisje and Pomorišje, after military frontier in these regions was abolished. In 1767, Kovačica was included into German regiment of Banatian Military Frontier. First Slovaks came here from Ečka and Aradac (in 1783) and after them, Slovaks from Arvas, Trenčin and Bekeš county came here as well (in 1801). From the middle of the 19th century, Kovačica is a center of municipality and cultural and social center of Slovaks in Banat.

Settlements
Kovačica municipality includes the town of Kovačica and the following villages:
 Crepaja
 Debeljača
 Idvor
 Padina
 Putnikovo
 Samoš
 Uzdin

Demographics

According to the last official census done in 2011, the municipality of Kovačica has 25,274 inhabitants, with 6,259 in town area.

Ethnic groups

Communities with Slovak majorities are: Kovačica and Padina. Communities with Serb majorities are: Crepaja, Idvor, Putnikovo and Samoš. There is one community with a Hungarian majority: Debeljača, and one community with a Romanian majority: Uzdin.

The ethnic composition of the municipality (as of 2011 census):

Economy
The following table gives a preview of total number of employed people per their core activity (as of 2017):

International relations

Twin towns — Sister cities
Kovačica is twinned with:
 Banská Bystrica, Slovakia

See also
Municipalities of Serbia
South Banat District

References

External links

 Art and Cultural Events In The Municipality of Kovačica

 
Slovak communities in Serbia
Populated places in Serbian Banat
Populated places in South Banat District
Municipalities and cities of Vojvodina
Towns in Serbia